The National Assembly is the unicameral legislature of Ecuador. It replaced the National Congress in 2009 following reforms under the 2008 Constitution. The current President of the Assembly is Virgilio Saquicela since 31 May 2022. Within Ecuador, the National Assembly has the power to pass laws, while appointment of judges to the National Court of Justice is done by a separate Judicial Council.

Ecuadorian general election, 2021

Eligibility
According to Article 119 of the 2008 Constitution of Ecuador, candidates to the National Assembly must meet the following requirements:
 Be an Ecuadorian national.
 Be at least 18 years of age at the time of registering for one's candidacy
 Be in possession of political rights

Presidency
For a list of presidents see: List of presidents of the National Assembly of Ecuador.

See also
 National Congress of Ecuador
 Politics of Ecuador
 List of legislatures by country
 Assembly members of the fourth legislative period of the National Assembly of Ecuador

References

External links
 

 

Government of Ecuador
Politics of Ecuador
Ecuador
Ecuador
2009 establishments in Ecuador